Bayou Costapia is a stream in the U.S. state of Mississippi. It is a tributary to the Biloxi River.

Bayou Costapia is a name derived from the Choctaw language purported to mean "fleas are therein". A variant name is "Costapla Creek".

References

Rivers of Mississippi
Rivers of Harrison County, Mississippi
Rivers of Jackson County, Mississippi
Mississippi placenames of Native American origin